Sebastian Münzenmaier (born 2 July 1989) is a German politician. Born in Darmstadt, Hesse, he represents Alternative for Germany (AfD). Sebastian Münzenmaier has served as a member of the Bundestag from the state of Rhineland-Palatinate since 2017.

Biography 
Münzenmaier was a member of the German Freedom Party before joining the AfD in 2013. He became member of the bundestag after the 2017 German federal election. He is a member of the Committee for Tourism.

References

External links 

  
 Bundestag biography 

1989 births
Living people
Members of the Bundestag for Rhineland-Palatinate
Members of the Bundestag 2017–2021
Members of the Bundestag 2021–2025
Members of the Bundestag for the Alternative for Germany